The Coca-Cola Company's formula for Coca-Cola syrup, which bottlers combine with carbonated water to create the company's flagship cola soft drink, is a closely guarded trade secret. Company founder Asa Candler initiated the veil of secrecy that surrounds the formula in 1891 as a publicity, marketing, and intellectual property protection strategy. While several recipes, each purporting to be the authentic formula, have been published, the company maintains that the actual formula remains a secret, known only to a very few select (and anonymous) employees.

History
 
Coca-Cola inventor John Pemberton is known to have shared his original formula with at least four people before his death in 1888. In 1891, Asa Candler purchased the rights to the formula from Pemberton's estate, founded the Coca-Cola Company, and instituted the shroud of secrecy that has since enveloped the formula. He also made changes to the ingredients list, which by most accounts improved the flavor, and entitled him to claim that anyone in possession of Pemberton's original formula no longer knew the "real" formula.

In 1919, Ernest Woodruff led a group of investors in purchasing the company from Candler and his family. As collateral for the acquisition loan, Woodruff placed the only written copy of the formula in a vault at the Guaranty Trust Company of New York. In 1925, when the loan had been repaid, Woodruff relocated the written formula to the Trust Company Bank (Truist Financial) in Atlanta. On December 8, 2011, the company placed it in a vault on the grounds of the World of Coca-Cola in Atlanta, with the vault on public display.

According to the company, only two employees are privy to the complete formula at any given time and they are not permitted to travel together. When one dies, the other must choose a successor within the company and impart the secret to that person. The identity of the two employees in possession of the secret is itself a secret.
However, the company's "secret formula" policy is more of a marketing strategy than an actual trade secret: any competitor in possession of the genuine Coke recipe would be unable to obtain key ingredients such as processed coca leaf, and even if all components were available, could not market the product as Coca-Cola.

During the late 19th century, Coca-Cola was one of many popular coca-based drinks with purported medicinal properties and benefits to health; early marketing materials claimed that Coca-Cola alleviated headaches and acted as a "brain and nerve tonic". Coca leaves were used in Coca-Cola's preparation; the small amount of cocaine they contained – along with caffeine originally sourced from kola nuts – provided the drink's "tonic" quality. In 1903, cocaine was removed, leaving caffeine as the sole stimulant ingredient, and all medicinal claims were dropped. By one account,  the FDA continued to screen random samples of Coca-Cola syrup for the presence of cocaine.

Some sources claim that coca leaf chemically processed to remove the cocaine remains part of the formula as a flavoring. According to these accounts, the company obtains the ingredient from the Stepan Company of Maywood, New Jersey, which legally extracts cocaine from coca leaves for use in pharmaceuticals, then sells the processed leaf material for use in Coca-Cola.  the company would neither confirm nor deny this, deferring to the secret nature of the formula.

In 1911, the United States government sued the Coca-Cola Company for violations of the Pure Food and Drug Act, claiming that the high concentration of caffeine in Coca-Cola syrup was harmful to health. The case was decided in favor of Coca-Cola, but a portion of the decision was set aside in 1916 by the Supreme Court. As part of a settlement, the company agreed to reduce the amount of caffeine in its syrup.

Current ingredients 

The company protects the secrecy of its syrup recipe by shipping ingredients to its syrup factories in the form of anonymous "merchandises", numbered 1 through 9. Factory managers are told the relative proportions of each numbered merchandise, and the mixing procedure, but not the ingredients in the merchandises, some of which are themselves mixtures of more basic ingredients. Merchandise no. 1 is known to be sugar, in the form of high-fructose corn syrup or sucrose (see variations, below); caramel coloring is no. 2, caffeine is no. 3, and phosphoric acid is no. 4. The identities of merchandises 5 through 9 are a matter of debate – particularly "merchandise 7X" (the "X" has never been explained), which is thought to contain a mixture of essential oils such as orange, lime, lemon, and lavender.

Despite the implications of its name, there is no evidence that the current version of Coca-Cola syrup contains kola nut extract, which was originally included for its caffeine content. The modern source of that additive is probably caffeine citrate, a byproduct of the decaffeination of coffee.

The primary taste of Coca-Cola is thought to come from vanilla and cinnamon, with trace amounts of essential oils, and spices such as nutmeg. A 2014 study identified and measured 58 aroma compounds in the top three US brands of cola, confirming significant amounts of compounds found in the essential oils of cinnamon, lemon, orange, neroli, coriander, nutmeg and vanilla.

Formula variations in the United States
During the 1980s, most U.S. Coca-Cola bottlers switched their primary sweetening ingredient from cane sugar (sucrose) to the cheaper high-fructose corn syrup. , the only U.S. bottler still using sucrose year-round was the Coca-Cola Bottling Company of Cleveland, which serves northern Ohio and a portion of Pennsylvania. Many bottlers outside the U.S. also continue to use sucrose as the primary sweetener.  glass bottles of sucrose-sweetened Coca-Cola imported from Mexico are available in many U.S. markets for those consumers who prefer the sucrose version (see "Mexican Coke", below).

Passover 
Coca-Cola was certified kosher in 1935 by Rabbi Tobias Geffen after beef tallow-derived glycerin was replaced with vegetable glycerin. However, the high-fructose corn syrup used by most U.S. bottlers since the 1980s renders it kitniyot by the definitions of Jewish kosher law, and therefore forbidden during Passover according to certain traditions. Each year, in the weeks leading up to Passover, bottlers in markets with substantial Jewish populations switch to sucrose sweetener in order to obtain Kosher for Passover certification.

"New Coke" 

In April 1985, in response to marketing research suggesting that a majority of North American consumers preferred the taste of rival Pepsi to Coca-Cola, the company introduced a sweeter, less effervescent version of Coca-Cola in the U.S. and Canada. Although the new formulation had beaten both Pepsi-Cola and the old Coke formula in multiple blind taste tests, consumer response was overwhelmingly negative. The company quickly reintroduced the original beverage, rebranded as "Coca-Cola Classic", while continuing to market the new version as simply "Coke".

The new version remained on the market, in North America only, for 17 years—the last 10 as "Coke II"—until it was quietly discontinued in 2002. The "Classic" designation remained on the original product's label, its prominence gradually decreasing over the years, until it was removed entirely in 2009.

Mexican Coke 

In the early 2000s, cane-sugar-sweetened Coca-Cola produced in Mexico began to appear in bodegas and Hispanic supermarkets in the Southwestern United States; in 2005, Costco began offering it. All were obtaining the Mexican product—which was not labeled in accordance with U.S. food labeling laws—outside the official Coca-Cola distribution network. In 2009, the Coca-Cola Company began officially importing Coca-Cola produced in Mexico, with proper labeling, for distribution through official channels.

Purported secret recipes

Pemberton recipe
Coca-Cola inventor John Pemberton is said to have written this recipe in his diary shortly before his death in 1888. The recipe does not specify when or how the ingredients are mixed, nor the flavoring oil quantity units of measure (though it implies that the "Merchandise 7X" was mixed first). This was common in recipes at the time, as it was assumed that preparers knew the method.

Ingredients:
 caffeine citrate
 citric acid
 vanilla extract
 lime juice
 "flavoring" (i.e., "Merchandise 7X")
 sugar
 fluid extract of coca leaves (flavor essence of the coca leaf)
 water
caramel sufficient to give color
"Mix caffeine, citric acid and lime juice in 1 quart boiling water add vanilla and flavoring when cool."

Flavoring (Merchandise 7X):
1 qrt alcohol
80 oil orange
40 oil cinnamon
120 oil lemon
20 oil coriander
40 oil nutmeg
40 oil neroli
"Let stand 24 hours."

Merory recipe
Recipe is from Food Flavorings: Composition, Manufacture and Use. Makes one  of syrup.

 Mix  of sugar with just enough water to dissolve the sugar fully. (High-fructose corn syrup may be substituted for half the sugar.)
 Add   of caramel,  caffeine, and   phosphoric acid.
 California white wine fortified to 20% strength was used as the soaking solution circa 1909, but Coca-Cola may have switched to a simple water/alcohol mixture.
 After soaking, discard the coca and kola and add the liquid to the syrup.
 Add  lime juice (a former ingredient, evidently, that Coca-Cola now denies) or a substitute such as a water solution of citric acid and sodium citrate at lime-juice strength.
 Mix together
 orange oil,
 cassia (Chinese cinnamon) oil,
 lemon oil, traces of
 nutmeg oil, and, if desired, traces of
coriander,
neroli, and
lavender oils.
A cloudy layer will separate.
 Take off the clear part of the liquid only and add to the syrup.
 Add water (treated with chlorine) to make a gallon of syrup.

Beal recipe

In 2011, Ira Glass announced on his Public Radio International show, This American Life, that show staffers had found a recipe in "Everett Beal's Recipe Book", reproduced in the February 28, 1979, issue of The Atlanta Journal-Constitution, that they believed was either Pemberton's original formula for Coca-Cola, or a version that he made either before or after the product was first sold in 1886. The formula is very similar to the one found in Pemberton's diary. Coca-Cola archivist Phil Mooney acknowledged that the recipe "could be a precursor" to the formula used in the original 1886 product, but emphasized that the original formula is not the same as the one used in the current product.

Fluid extract of Coca: 3 drams USP
Citric acid: 3 oz
Caffeine: 1 oz
Sugar: 30 lbs
Water: 2.5 gal
Lime juice: 2 pints (1 quart)
Vanilla: 1 oz
Caramel: 1.5 oz or more for color

The secret 7X flavor (use 2 oz of flavor to 5 gals syrup):
Alcohol: 8 oz 
Orange oil: 20 drops
Cinnamon oil: 10 drops
Lemon oil: 30 drops
Coriander oil: 5 drops
Nutmeg oil: 10 drops
Neroli oil: 10 drops

See also 

 List of brand name soft drink products
 List of soft drink flavors
 Open-source cola
 OpenCola

References

External links
 Secret Formula of Coca-Cola, documentary by National Geographic, March 9, 2011

Coca-Cola
Trade secrets